Rabl Chocolate & Sweets Factory Ltd. was one of Israel's largest chocolate and sweet manufacturers during the twentieth century. Rabl was founded by Willy Hans Rabl, a Czechoslovak refugee, in Tel Aviv, Israel. It was a listed company on the Israel Directory. Rabl exported hard boiled sweets across the Middle East.

References

External links 

 Rabl Excelsior chocolate wrapper 

Chocolate companies
Israeli brands
Companies listed on the Tel Aviv Stock Exchange